The Iranian ambassador in Rabat was the official representative of the Government in Tehran to the Government of Morocco.

Direction of the Embassy:
Ambassade Imperiale de l'Iran 7 Rue Al-Qassar
Interest Section: Avenue Bir Kacem

List of representatives

References 

 
Morocco
Iran